Whiteforce is a 1988 Australian-Philippines film directed by Eddie Romero starring Sam Jones and Kimberley Pastone. The screenplay concerns an undercover agent accused of murdering his partner.

References

External links

1988 films
Australian television films
1980s English-language films
Films directed by Eddie Romero